The signaled by retinoic acid 8 (Stra8) gene is activated only upon stimulation by retinoic acid and expresses a cytoplasmic protein in the gonads of male and female vertebrates. This protein functions to initiate the transition between mitosis and meiosis, aiding in spermatogenesis and oogenesis. In females, its signaling begins 12.5 days after conception, is localized in the primordial germ cells of female ovaries, and ushers in the first stage of meiosis. Male expression begins postnatally and continues throughout life, matching the need of spermatogenesis compared to the limited window of oogenesis in females. Sperm of mice that had induced null mutations for Stra8 gene were able to undergo mitotic divisions, and while some sperm were able to transition into the early stages of meiosis I, but could not transition into further sub-stages of meiosis I.  Errors in chromosome pairing and chromosome condensation were observed following these failures.  In female mice, loss of Stra8 signaling shows failure to enter into meiosis. Both males and females are left infertile if Stra8 signaling is absent.

References 

Genes

According to the Asian Journal of Andrology, Stra8 is a gene that is stimulated by retinoic acid and participates as a signaling molecule in inducing meiosis and has critical role in spermatogenesis. As stated in this journal it is said that Stra8 performs many functions in spermatogenesis, such as spermatogonia proliferation and self-renewal, spermatogonia differentiation and meiosis, through differentially expressed genes. Retinoic Acid drives development and is the signal for meiosis to begin and cells starting to divide. It is commonly known for women who are pregnant to avoid using creams or acne treatments that contain Retinoic Acid because it can cause a fetus to have development issues due to rapid cell division initiated by Stra8 (Retinoic Acid gene). According to Dr. Michael Golding of Texas A&M University, there is a gene, CYP26B1, that degrades retinoic acid which would prevent meiosis is male germ cells, as well as blocks the expression of Stra8 in germ cells which will delay meiosis until after puberty. Birth defects associated with Stra8 may cause a fetus to have parts of their body that are not fully developed like a cleft clip. Research done by Yani Zhang, Yingjie Wang, Qisheng Zuo, and Dong Li found that Cas9/gRNA resulted in a knockout of the Stra8 gene performed in chicken’s cells that inhibited male germ cell differentiation. Stra8 is an important gene in meiosis and spermatogenesis and there will continue to be a lot of research over this gene over what blocks its expression or enhances it.